Edith Kinney Gaylord (March 5, 1916 – January 28, 2001), also referred to as Edith Gaylord Harper, was an American journalist and philanthropist.

Early life

She was born on March 5, 1916, in Oklahoma City to Inez and E. K. Gaylord. Her father was editor and publisher of The Oklahoman and The Oklahoma City Times. She spent two semesters in private school in Switzerland, then returned to Oklahoma City to attend public schools and graduated from Classen High School. She briefly attended Colorado College in Colorado Springs before graduating from Wells College in Aurora, New York in 1939 with a Bachelor of Arts degree.

Career

Gaylord began her journalistic career reporting for her father’s newspaper and radio station in Oklahoma City. In the summer of 1942, she was hired by the Associated Press in New York and was transferred five months later to their Washington, D.C. bureau. She was the first female employee on the general news staff.

She filed stories from New York, Hollywood, San Francisco and Chicago while following Madam Chiang Kai-shek on her tour of America. When first lady Eleanor Roosevelt insisted the AP send a female reporter to cover her news conferences, Gaylord was assigned to the task, and developed a friendship with Mrs. Roosevelt. She became Mrs. Roosevelt's media liaison when she was elected president of the National Women’s Press Club in 1944.  She also covered other notable events, including a visit to the United States by Madame Chiang, the death of Franklin Roosevelt and the new first lady Bess Truman.

Gaylord returned to Oklahoma City after the end of World War II, but rejoined the Associated Press in the early 1950s, covering the 1953 coronation of Queen Elizabeth II in London and other major events. She came back to the family business in 1963. Gaylord served as a member of the board of directors and corporate secretary for The Oklahoma Publishing Company.

Philanthropy
Gaylord quietly began her philanthropy efforts in the 1960s, often donating anonymously to those in need. In 1982 she founded both Inasmuch Foundation and Ethics and Excellence in Journalism Foundation to carry out her giving. Gaylord became a charter trustee at Colorado College in Colorado Springs and was awarded an honorary Doctor of Humane Letters degree from the college in 1992.The University of Oklahoma also presented Gaylord with an honorary Doctor of Humane Letters degree in 1997 for her contributions.

Gaylord died on January 28, 2001, at St. Anthony’s Hospital in Oklahoma City, the same hospital where she had been born 84 years earlier.

Legacy
Universities in several states have honored the memory of Gaylord by naming new academic centers or professorships for her.

 University of Oklahoma, Gaylord College: Edith Kinney Gaylord Library
 Oklahoma City University, Ann Lacy School of American Dance and Arts Management: Edith Kinney Gaylord Center
 Arizona State University, Cronkite School of Journalism: Edith Kinney Gaylord Visiting Professorship in Journalism Ethics
 University of Maryland, College Park, Knight Hall for Journalism: Edith Kinney Gaylord Library and Resource Center
 Colorado College: Edith Kinney Gaylord Cornerstone Arts Center and Edith Gaylord House

References

1916 births
2001 deaths
American women journalists
Classen School of Advanced Studies alumni
Wells College alumni
Philanthropists from New York (state)
People from Oklahoma City
20th-century American philanthropists
20th-century American women
20th-century American people